MFCS, the International Symposium on Mathematical Foundations of Computer Science is an academic conference organized annually since 1972. The topics of the conference cover the entire field of theoretical computer science. Up to 2012, the conference was held in different locations in Poland, Czech Republic and Slovakia but, since MFCS 2013, it travels around Europe. All contributions are strongly peer-reviewed. From 1974 to 2015, conference articles were published in proceedings published by Springer in the Lecture Notes in Computer Science series. Since 2016 the proceedings have been published by the Leibniz International Proceedings in Informatics.

Recent history of the symposium 

 the Steering Committee of the MFCS symposia series had been chaired since 2012 by Antonín Kučera.

References

Theoretical computer science conferences
Recurring events established in 1972